The men's 100 metres T53 took place in Stadium Australia.

There were two heats and one final round. The T53 is for athletes who have good function in their arms but limited trunk function.

Heats

Heat 1

Heat 2

Final round

References

Athletics at the 2000 Summer Paralympics